Diana Ross Presents The Jackson 5 is the debut studio album from Gary, Indiana-based soul family band the Jackson 5, released on the Motown label on December 12, 1969. The Jackson 5's lead singer, a preadolescent Michael Jackson and his four older brothers Jackie, Tito, Jermaine, and Marlon, became pop successes within months of this album's release. Diana Ross Presents the Jackson 5's only single, "I Want You Back", became a number-one hit on the US Billboard Hot 100 within weeks of the album's release. The album reached number 5 on the US Pop Albums chart, and spent nine weeks at No. 1 on the US R&B/Black Albums chart.

The album title suggested that Motown star Diana Ross had discovered the group, as do the Ross-penned liner notes on the back cover. Ross' supposed discovery of the Jackson 5 was in fact part of Motown's marketing and promotions plan for the Jackson 5; it may actually have been Motown producer Bobby Taylor who discovered them. Joe Jackson, the father and manager of the Jackson 5, thanked the "lovely Gladys Knight, (who) extended a helping hand to our family, by calling Motown executives and talking their ear off to take time out of their schedule and meet with us.  She believed in us before others. Always grateful to her." Knight also said she brought the Jackson 5 to Motown's attention. Regardless, Ross embraced her assigned role and helped promote the group, especially grooming young Michael Jackson as a star.

Recording the album

Working with Bobby Taylor
Motown CEO Berry Gordy brought the group to Motown's Hitsville U.S.A. studio in Detroit, Michigan, and assigned them to work with Bobby Taylor as their producer. Taylor, who had personally brought the Jacksons to Motown, began having Michael, Jermaine, Jackie, Tito and Marlon record cover versions of current and past soul compositions, including many in the Motown catalog. Over two dozen of these recordings were done, including covers of songs by the Temptations ("(I Know) I'm Losing You", "Born to Love You"), Marvin Gaye ("Chained"), Stevie Wonder ("My Cherie Amour"), the Miracles ("Who's Lovin' You"), and the Four Tops ("Standing in the Shadows of Love"). Among the non-Motown covers done were versions of Sly & the Family Stone's "Stand!", the Delfonics' "Can You Remember", and "Zip-a-Dee-Doo-Dah" from the Walt Disney film Song of the South. The Jackson 5 also re-recorded "You've Changed", a song they first recorded in 1967 which was released on the B side of their first local hit single Big Boy for the Steeltown label before joining the Motown roster. 

All of the songs Taylor recorded with the Jackson 5 during these summer 1969 sessions held close to the group's traditional R&B/soul sound, a sound somewhat less pop-aware than Motown's signature "Motown Sound". Of these recordings, the most famous became the cover of "Who's Lovin' You", with Michael Jackson re-delivering Smokey Robinson's often-covered plea for the return of a long-gone lover. The Jackson 5's version of the song supplanted the Miracles' original as the definitive recording of the song, and many of the future covers of the song (for example, En Vogue's cover at the beginning of their 1990 single "Hold On"), are based upon this version. 

The Jackson 5 recorded a number of songs with Bobby Taylor during these summer 1969 sessions that remained in the Motown vault for several years, including covers of Ray Charles' "A Fool for You", the Four Tops' "Reach Out, I'll Be There", the Isley Brothers' "It's Your Thing", and a version of Bobby Taylor's own "Oh, I've Been Blessed". These recordings would turn up on various Jackson 5 compilations, and virtually all of them were included on the boxed set Soulsation!.

The Corporation's involvement
In August 1969, Berry Gordy decided to take a more direct role in the Jackson 5's career. He had the Jacksons and their father, Joseph, move from Detroit to Los Angeles, California, where Gordy had a satellite studio (the Motown operation would move to Los Angeles by 1972). Taylor followed the group, and continued to work on the cover songs.

During this period, Gordy came across "I Want to Be Free", a composition written by West Coast-based Motown producers Freddie Perren, Alphonzo Mizell, and Deke Richards for Gladys Knight. At first, Gordy wanted the three producers to instead record the song with Diana Ross, but soon decided to give the song "the Frankie Lymon treatment" and record it with the Jackson 5. Richards, Mizell, and Perren began re-working the song, and Gordy and Taylor also became involved in the revision process. The result was "I Want You Back", which became the Jackson 5's first Motown single, and the first of four Jackson 5 songs that went to number-one on the Billboard Hot 100 chart in 1970.

"I Want You Back" became the blueprint for future Jackson 5 recordings: there was now less of an emphasis on traditional soul, and more prominent elements of doo-wop and bubblegum pop music. In fact, Motown's publicity department dubbed the Jackson 5's sound "bubblegum soul".

Gordy, Richards, Mizell, and Perren also contributed the album track "Nobody" to Diana Ross Presents the Jackson 5; left out was Taylor, although he later performed uncredited production work on the second Jackson 5 album, ABC and its singles. All of the songs produced and written by Gordy, Richards, Mizell and Perren were billed under the name "the Corporation," a group that Gordy formed to handle future Jackson 5 recordings to avoid a repeat of the issues that arose when former Motown songwriters/producers Holland-Dozier-Holland were known by name and became as famous as the artists for whom they produced.

Track listing
All songs produced by Bobby Taylor except for "Nobody" and "I Want You Back", produced by the Corporation.

Although "Reach Out, I'll Be There" was originally considered for inclusion on the album and appears on the back of early pressings, it was replaced by "Born to Love You." It was released in 1995 on the boxed set Soulsation!

Recording sessions
The songs on the album were recorded during May–August 1969.

Other tracks taken from its sessions include:
"Listen I'll Tell You How"
"Oh, I've Been Bless'd"
"To Sir, with Love"
"I'm Your Sunny One"
"After You Leave Girl"
"You've Really Got a Hold on Me"
"It's Your Thing"
"Since I Lost My Baby"

Re-release
In 2001, Motown Records remastered all Jackson 5 albums in a "Two Classic Albums/One CD" series, as they had previously done in the late 1980s. Diana Ross Presents the Jackson 5 was paired up with ABC. One bonus track was included in a cover of Bobby Taylor's "Oh, I've Been Bless'd", a song also released on the rare 1979 outtakes album Boogie.

Personnel
Technical
David Blumberg, David Van DePitte, Paul Riser, The Corporation – arrangements
Curtis McNair – artwork direction
Ken Kim – artwork, design
Jim Hendin – cover photography

Charts

Weekly charts

Year-end charts

See also
List of number-one R&B albums of 1970 (U.S.)

References

Bibliography
 Hamilton, Andrew (2003). "[ Bobby Taylor]". AllMusic. Retrieved July 16, 2006.
Olsen, Eric (15 June 2005). "Michael Jackson and the Jackson 5 At Motown: A Long Long Time Ago". Blogcritics.org.. Retrieved July 16, 2006.

External links
 Overview of album at www.jackson5abc.com 

1969 debut albums
The Jackson 5 albums
Motown albums
Albums recorded at Hitsville U.S.A.
Albums arranged by Paul Riser
Albums produced by Berry Gordy
Albums produced by Freddie Perren
Albums produced by Deke Richards
Albums produced by Alphonzo Mizell
Albums produced by the Corporation (record production team)